Aggie Mack was a newspaper comic strip about a teenage girl. Created by Hal Rasmusson, it was distributed by the Chicago Tribune Syndicate beginning on September 2, 1946, and concluding on January 9, 1972. It had a 26-year run, with a title change to Aggie during the final six years.

Publication history 
When Rasmusson was in ill health, the series was taken over by Roy L. Fox, starting with the strip dated January 8, 1962; Rasmusson died later that year. In 1966, the title was shortened to Aggie. The final episode of the strip was published on January 9, 1972.
Beginning in 1947, the strip was very popular in France where it was published in the Fillette magazine. In 1960, Gérard Alexandre (who used the pseudonym AL.G.) created an all-French version of the strip and titled it Aggie.

Characters and story 
The central figure was a blonde named Aggie (a nickname based on her first name Agnes). Aggie was raised by her father's second wife, who favored her own daughter, Mona, a few years older than Aggie. Comics historian Don Markstein commented:

Reprints
Aggie was adapted to comic books by Superior Comics, which published eight issues between January 1948 and August 1949. In 1962, Dell Comics adapted Aggie into an issue of their Four Color Comics.

See also
Etta Kett
Freckles and His Friends
Harold Teen
Kate Osann
Marty Links
Penny
Teena
Zits

References

External links
Comic Strip Fan

1946 comics debuts
1971 comics endings
Mack, Aggie
American comic strips
Mack, Aggie
Comics about women
Mack, Aggie
Mack, Aggie
Teen comedy comics